XHTL-FM is a radio station in San Luis Potosí, San Luis Potosí. Broadcasting on 99.3 FM, XHTL is operated by MG Radio and carries its Adult Contemporary format of Más FM.

History
Alfonso Torre López received the concession for XHTL on February 15, 1973.

The station was long leased by Grupo ACIR, outright owner of the city's XHQK-FM 98.5. On February 26, 2020, the Mix and La Comadre formats swapped frequencies in San Luis, with Mix going to XHQK.

In November 2021, ACIR opted to end its lease of XHQK-FM. The station dropped all La Comadre branding. A month later, the station changed music Regional Mexican formats to music in English and Spanish from the 1980s, 1990s, and 2000s, as MG Radio took over operations.

As of January 7, 2022, it begins to be identified as Más FM, a concept that had already been in XHWZ-FM 90.9 between 2013 and 2016.

References

Radio stations in San Luis Potosí
Radio stations established in 1973